Ala is a village in Chenganoor taluk of Alappuzha district in the Indian state of Kerala.

Demographics
 India census, Ala had a population of 14057 with 6641 males and 7416 females.

Educational Institutions in ALA 

 Sree Narayana College Chengannur
 S.N Turst Secondary School
 Government  Higher secondary School
 Government L.P.S, ALA
Providence College of Engineering.

References

Villages in Alappuzha district